Brachioteuthis is a genus of squid comprising five species.

The genus contains bioluminescent species.

Species
Brachioteuthis beanii
Brachioteuthis behnii
Brachioteuthis bowmani *
Brachioteuthis picta, ornate arm squid
Brachioteuthis riisei, common arm squid

The species listed above with an asterisk (*) is questionable and needs further study to determine if it is a valid species or a synonym.

References

External links

Squid
Taxa named by Addison Emery Verrill
Cephalopod genera
Bioluminescent molluscs